World Vision Appalachia is an organization of World Vision, an international Christian relief and humanitarian organization serving the world's under-resourced children and families in nearly 100 countries.  World Vision Appalachia's work in Appalachia, United States began in 1983 when the organization provided a $1000 grant to help fund the construction of a basketball court in the Chestnut Ridge community of Barbour County, West Virginia.  This grant and the completion of the basketball court marked the beginning of what has grown into over twenty-four years of a deepening commitment to the Appalachian region.  World Vision Appalachia serves families and organizations in 37 of West Virginia's 55 counties and surrounding states.

Organizational structure
World Vision Appalachia takes a holistic approach to community development, focusing on education and youth development, providing essential material goods for everyday life, Community Mobilization and capacity building for local partners, and disaster response and preparedness.  World Vision Appalachia has built a range of programs around these focus areas that work together to transform lives and communities.

Education and Youth Development
KidREACH (Relating, Educating and Communicating Hope) is an after-school program providing mentoring and tutoring to 135 children in four elementary schools in Barbour, Taylor, and Braxton counties.
Youth programs offer safe, positive activities to more than 200 middle and high school students in five communities in Barbour, Taylor, and Branxton counties through one-on-one mentoring, academic support, crisis ministry and intervention, substance abuse counseling, vocational training, and relationship skills training.
Vocational education teaches young people ages 17 to 25 in Barbour County the practical and administrative job skills needed to get a job or run a business.

Gifts in Kind (Essentials for Daily Living)
Building Materials - To help repair homes and community facilities, the Storehouse offers a wide variety of building materials, from paint and plumbing supplies to windows and weatherproofing.
Health Products Center/Medical Network - World Vision has launched a new partnership with Cardinal Health Care last year to pilot a health products center with the Storehouse.  The center provides medical supplies and equipment to health care providers, and over-the-counter products to our ministry and community partners.
School Supplies - The Storehouse operates a program that distributes school and office supplies to teachers, who provide them to students who otherwise would go without.  These tools are provided to eight schools in Barbour County.

Community Mobilization and Capacity Building
The Family Initiative - This program is designed to help build strong families.  It is based on a yearlong analysis of local needs and national best practices being performed by two professional research teams.
Mission Teams - The challenge of reversing cycles of decay and hopelessness in small communities requires bringing together community leaders from the neighborhood and energized volunteers—often from churches across the country.  World Vision offers mission projects for families or youth groups.  High school and junior high school teams, or family groups come for a week during spring or summer break.  During the summer program, an estimated 600 to 800 people from churches representing a variety of denominations participate in the Appalachia mission.
Community Capacity Building - The Ministry Resource Center is a lending library for faith-based and community leaders with more than 2,500 books, videos, cassettes, and CDs.  The center also sponsors seminars and trainings for church and community leaders.  Targeting Hope is an annual small cities and rural communities Christian Community Development (CCD) conference held every 18 months in Appalachia for 200 national leaders.  It has been replicated, and the Navaho nation also hosts a CCD conference.
Neighbor-to-Neighbor Time Bank - The Time Bank is an exchange of services that matches people, skills, and needs.  For every hour donated to the Time Bank, members are eligible to use equal hours in services offered by others.

Disaster Response and Preparedness
In 2002, the Storehouse provided assistance to those affected by severe flooding in the southern part of West Virginia by distributing more than $500,000 in disaster relief materials.  Afterward, World Vision was named by the governor of West Virginia as a key agency in the distribution of disaster relief items.  To help provide service in this area, the Storehouse is a member of the West Virginia chapter of Volunteer Organizations Active in Disaster.

References

Social welfare charities based in the United States
Organizations established in 1950
Emergency organizations